Woodman station (signed as Woodman/Valley Glen) is a station on the G Line of the Los Angeles Metro Busway system.  It is named after adjacent Woodman Avenue, which travels north-south and crosses the east-west busway route. The station is in the Valley Glen district of Los Angeles, in the San Fernando Valley. The station is located next to Oxnard Street, and east of Woodman Avenue.

Service

Station Layout

Hours and frequency

Connections 
, the following connections are available:
 Los Angeles Metro Bus: ,

Station artwork 

The terrazzo paving areas and porcelain enamel steel fence panels at this station are called "Journey to California" by Daniel Marlos. They resemble quilt designs that are centuries old and have descriptive names that correspond to important events. ‘Road to California’, ‘Railroad Crossing’, ‘Wandering Paths’, and ‘Wagon Wheel’ are just a few that actually deal with transportation. The selected pattern, Journey to California, is a pattern that references both California and travel.

References

External links

LA Metro: Orange Line Timetable - schedules
LA Metro: Orange Line map and stations - route map and station addresses and features
Orange Line history
LA Metro - countywide: official website

G Line (Los Angeles Metro)
Los Angeles Metro Busway stations
Public transportation in the San Fernando Valley
Public transportation in Los Angeles
Bus stations in Los Angeles
Valley Glen, Los Angeles
2005 establishments in California